Hesleden is a hamlet in Littondale in the Yorkshire Dales in England. It lies within the civil parish of Halton Gill in the Craven district of North Yorkshire.

The name is first recorded (as Eseldene) in a charter of Fountains Abbey in about 1206.  The name means "hazel valley", from the Old English hæsel and denu.

References 

Villages in North Yorkshire